Rikas tyttö (English translation - The Rich Girl) is a 1939 Finnish film directed by Valentin Vaala.

Full credited cast
Sirkka Sari as Anni Hall
Olavi Reimas as Vilhelm Vinter
Lea Joutseno as Lea
Hannes Häyrinen as Markus Hall
Irma Seikkula as Irja Rantanen
Turo Kartto as Baron Allan Ahlfeldt
Anni Aitto as Mrs. Hall
Arvi Tuomi as Alfred Hall
Elsa Rantalainen as Mrs. Karila
Eija Karipää as Edla Lundström (as Eija Londén)
Uolevi Räsänen as Lasse
Tuulikki Schreck as Auroora Rantanen

Production
The film is remembered today for being the last film starring Sirkka Sari, due to her death at a party for the cast and crew of the film. Due to Sari's death, another actress replaced her for the few remaining scenes that needed to be filmed. Scenes were shot from further away to hide the fact her character was being played by another actress.

Reception
Writer C. Celli compared the film to previous Vaala films in that it "repeats the urban-rural theme in a class tension melodrama".

References

External links
 

1939 films
Finnish black-and-white films
Finnish comedy films
1939 comedy films